Spinner is the surname of:

Bryson Spinner (born 1980), American football quarterback
Francis E. Spinner (1802–1890), U.S. Representative from New York
Jackie Spinner (born 1970), American journalist
Leopold Spinner (1906–1980), Ukrainian-born, British-domiciled composer and editor
Tony Spinner (born 1963), American rock and blues singer and guitarist
Steve Spinner (born 1969), American business executive
Graham Spinner (Born 1978) British Postman.

See also 

Spinner (disambiguation)